Claude "Dusty" Rhodes is an American former Negro league pitcher who played in the 1930s.

Rhodes played for the Louisville Black Caps in 1932. In five recorded appearances on the mound, he posted a 4.91 ERA over 33 innings.

References

External links
 and Seamheads

Year of birth missing
Place of birth missing
Louisville Black Caps players
Baseball pitchers